Dasht-e Ahmad (also Romanized as Dasht-e Aḩmad) is a village in Kushk-e Qazi Rural District, in the Central District of Fasa County, Fars Province, Iran. At the 2006 census, its population was 149, in 34 families.

References 

Populated places in Fasa County